Hemal Trivedi is an Indian documentary film director, editor and producer. She is best known for her work on the documentaries Shabeena's Quest, and Among the Believers.

Life and career
Hemal was born and raised in Maharashtra, India. She holds an MBA in Marketing from SVKM's NMIMS and an MFA from the University of Florida.

In 2015, Hemal co-directed the feature documentary, Among the Believers, along with Mohammed Ali Naqvi, which premiered at the Tribeca Film Festival. The Central Board of Film Censors (CFBC) banned, Among the Believers, from being screened in Pakistan, giving the reason that it "projects the negative image of Pakistan in the context of ongoing fight against extremism terrorism." Both Hemal and co-director Mohammed Ali Naqvi received death threats after the release of the film, forcing them to go into hiding for a period of time.
In 2020, Hemal directed, Battleground, about current political divide, as seen through the eyes of two grassroots political leaders in the key pivot county of Lehigh Valley, Pennsylvania, and aired nationally on PBS.

Filmography

Awards and nominations

References

External links
 
 

Living people
Indian documentary film editors
Indian women film editors
Indian women film directors
Women documentary filmmakers
Indian documentary film directors
Film directors from Mumbai
Indian women documentary filmmakers
Year of birth missing (living people)